Tha8t'z Gangsta is the sixth studio album by American rapper MC Eiht. It was released on May 8, 2001 via Half-Ounce Records. Recording sessions took place at 6 Point Productions Studio and Dedal Recordings. Production was handled by Binky Mack, Tha Chill, Dâm-Funk, DJ Raw Steele, Young Trey, and MC Eiht, who also served as executive producer. The album peaked at number 75 on the Billboard Top R&B/Hip-Hop Albums chart in the United States.

Track listing

Sample credits
Track 15 contains replayed elements of "She's Just a Groupie" as recorded by Bobby Nunn

Personnel
Aaron "MC Eiht" Tyler – vocals, producer (tracks: 8, 9, 14), executive producer
Damon "Dâm-Funk" Riddick – keyboards (tracks: 10, 11, 15), producer (tracks: 8, 9, 14, 15)
Ryan "Binky" Gardner – producer (tracks: 8-11, 14)
Vernon "Tha Chill" Johnson – producer (tracks: 2, 3, 6, 13)
N. "Raw Steel" Steele – producer (tracks: 1, 5, 12)
Treyvon "Young Tre" Green – producer (tracks: 4, 7)
Rashad Coes – mixing
Kris Solem – mastering
Omar Guzman – art direction, design
Liza Orozco – photography

Charts

References

External links 

2001 albums
MC Eiht albums
Albums produced by MC Eiht